The following lists events that happened during 2012 in the Republic of Rwanda.

Incumbents 
 President: Paul Kagame 
 Prime Minister: Pierre Habumuremyi

Events

January
 January 25 - 10 people are injured in a grenade attack in the south of Rwanda.

June
 June 18 - Rwanda's "gacaca courts", set up to try those responsible for playing a role in the Rwandan genocide, finish their work.

July
 July 15 - Rwanda and the Democratic Republic of the Congo agree an international border force to patrol their mutual border.
 July 29 - The Democratic Republic of the Congo accuses Rwanda of backing rebels hostile to the Congolese government.

References

 
2010s in Rwanda
Years of the 21st century in Rwanda
Rwanda
Rwanda